Citation of United Kingdom legislation includes the systems used for legislation passed by devolved parliaments and assemblies, for secondary legislation, and for prerogative instruments.  It is relatively complex both due to the different sources of legislation in the United Kingdom, and because of the different histories of the constituent countries of the United Kingdom.

Citation of primary legislation as a whole

Each piece of legislation passed by the Parliament of the United Kingdom ("Westminster") is known as an Act of Parliament.

Each modern Act of Parliament has a title (also known as a "long title") and a short title. A short title provides a convenient name for referring to an individual Act, such as "Jamaica Independence Act 1962". The long title is more comprehensive in scope, providing a sometimes very detailed description of the Act's provisions that is too unwieldy for convenient citation; for example, the long title of the Environmental Protection Act 1990 is around 400 words.

Acts are today split between three series, public general Acts, local Acts, and personal Acts, and cited accordingly.  Each Act within each series is numbered sequentially with a chapter number, identifying it as a chapter of the (notional) statute book. Since 1 January 1963, chapter numbers in each series are organised by calendar year. The first public general Act passed in a year is "c. 1", the second is "c. 2", and so on; the first local Act of a year is "c. i", the second is "c. ii", and so on; while the first personal Act of a year is "c. 1", the second is "c. 2", and so on (note the use of italics).

Chapter numbers for Acts passed before the Acts of Parliament Numbering and Citation Act 1962 are not by calendar year, but instead by the year(s) of the reign during which the relevant parliamentary session was held; thus the Jamaica Independence Act 1962 is cited as "10 & 11 Eliz. 2 c. 40", meaning the 40th Act passed during the session that started in the 10th year of the reign of Elizabeth II and which finished in the 11th year of that reign. Note that the regnal numeral – the 2 of Eliz. 2 – is an Arabic rather than a Roman numeral.

Earlier practice was to specify the parliamentary session by the year in which it started only – and sometimes to date its Acts accordingly.  So, for example, the Adventurers Act was passed by the session 16 Cha. 1 in 1642 and is cited as 16 Cha. 1 c.33. That session began in 1640. In consequence the Act is often referred to as the Adventurers Act 1640: despite being passed in response to events in 1641.

Short titles were only introduced in the middle of the nineteenth century, and it was only by the late 1890s that every individual Act of Parliament had one. Some earlier Acts that originally lacked a short title were given one by later legislation, most notably by the Short Titles Act 1896; also, since the independence of the Irish state in 1922, an Act may have a different short title in the United Kingdom and in the Republic of Ireland because of the different legislation passed in the two states. Older Acts may also have a "conventional" short title, such as "Crewe's Act".

Historic legislation

The Parliament of the United Kingdom came into being on 1 January 1801; before that date, legislation was passed either by the Parliament of Great Britain or the Parliament of Ireland. Similarly, the Parliament of Great Britain came into being on 1 May 1707 (OS); before that date, legislation was passed either by the Parliament of England or the Parliament of Scotland. Acts passed by each of these parliaments, except for the Parliament of Scotland, are cited in the same way as pre-1963 Acts of the Parliament of the United Kingdom; i.e., by parliamentary session and chapter number. Acts passed by the Parliament of Scotland are cited by calendar year and chapter number.

Acts of the last session of the Parliament of Great Britain and the first session of the Parliament of the United Kingdom are both cited as "41 Geo. 3". The numbering runs straight through, effectively merging the sessions: that is, the numbers for the Parliament of Great Britain's Acts continue unbroken from the numbers for the Parliament of England's.

Some individual Acts from these Parliaments have more than one citation, depending on the edition in which the Act is printed. Modern practice for the Parliaments of England and Great Britain is to follow the citations used in The Statutes of the Realm, while for Scotland the citations used are those in The Acts of the Parliaments of Scotland (both of which are considered legally authoritative). These latter citations are also used in the official Chronological Table of the Statutes.

Only a small number of Acts passed by these Parliaments have been given a short title by later legislation.

Primary legislation passed by devolved bodies

All legislation passed by the various devolved parliaments and assemblies has both a short title and a long title.

Parliament of Northern Ireland (1921 to 1972)

Each piece of legislation passed by the former Parliament of Northern Ireland (Stormont) was also known as an Act of Parliament. The system of citation of Northern Ireland Acts of Parliament is almost identical to that for the Westminster Parliament, except that the change to numbering by calendar year happened earlier (starting in 1943), and that Northern Ireland Acts are cited in Westminster legislation with "(N.I.)" appended to the chapter number.

There is a difference in naming convention between Acts passed in Northern Ireland and Acts passed at Westminster but relating to Northern Ireland.  Thus, the Criminal Evidence Act (Northern Ireland) 1923 is an Act passed at Stormont, but the Criminal Appeal (Northern Ireland) Act 1930 is an Act passed at Westminster (note the different placement of "(Northern Ireland)" in the two).

Northern Ireland Assembly (since 1999)

Acts passed by the Northern Ireland Assembly are cited by calendar year and chapter number.

Scottish Parliament (since 1999)

Each Act of the Scottish Parliament is cited by calendar year and the acronymic "asp" number ; e.g., the Abolition of Feudal Tenure etc. (Scotland) Act 2000 is "2000 asp 5".

National Assembly for Wales (since 1999)

Measures of the National Assembly for Wales (2003–2011) are cited by calendar year and the acronymic "nawm" number; e.g., the Welsh Language (Wales) Measure 2011 is "2011 nawm 1" ("" in Welsh).

Acts of the National Assembly for Wales (2012–2020) are cited by calendar year and acronymic "anaw" number; e.g. the National Assembly for Wales (Official Languages) Act 2012 is "2012 anaw 1" ("" in Welsh).

Acts of the Senedd Cymru (2020–) are cited by calendar year and acronymic "asc" number; e.g. the Wild Animals and Circuses (Wales) Act 2020 is "2020 asc 2" ("" in Welsh).

Church of England legislation (since 1920)

Measures passed by the General Synod of the Church of England (formerly the Church Assembly) follow the numbering conventions used for Westminster legislation, except that each Measure has a "Number" rather than a chapter number. For example, the New Parishes Measure 1943 is cited as "6 & 7 Geo. 6 No. 1".

Citation of secondary legislation as a whole

With the exception of Northern Ireland secondary legislation, each piece of secondary legislation made in the United Kingdom since 1948 has been numbered as a Statutory Instrument (or SI). Most individual SIs have what is generally referred to as a "short title" (despite none having a "long title"). Each SI is centrally registered and issued with a number; the numbering resumes from "1" at the start of each calendar year.  Thus, the Northern Ireland Negotiations (Referendum) Order 1998 is cited as "SI 1998 No. 1126", or more simply as "SI 1998/1126".  Commencement orders are also numbered separately as part of a "C." sub-series; this number is appended to the main number. Statutory Instruments relating to Scotland were similarly numbered as part of an "S." sub-series until the series of Scottish Statutory Instruments began (for which, see below).

The system for Statutory Rules and Orders in place from 1894 to 1947 was less comprehensive.  However, those instruments centrally registered and issued with a number follow the same pattern; thus the Trinidad and Tobago (Constitution) Order in Council 1950 is numbered as "SI 1950 No. 510".

The annual volumes of SIs before 1961, and all those for SR&Os, were organised by subject matter rather than by instrument number. This means that these instruments should ideally be cited by both number and page reference; thus the full citation for the Trinidad and Tobago (Constitution) Order in Council 1950 would be "SI 1950 No. 510 (SI 1950 Vol. II p. 1156)".

Some prerogative instruments are also printed in appendices to the annual volumes of SIs. These instruments are not numbered, and are thus cited by page number only; e.g., the Fiji (Appeal to Privy Council) Order in Council 1950 is cited as "SI 1950 Vol. II p. 1555".

Older secondary legislation frequently lacks a short title.  An example of an incorrect citation as a result of this can be found in regulation 3 of the Cremation (Amendment) Regulations 2006 (SI 2006/92). Reference is made to "the Regulations as to Cremation (1930)", but the Joint Committee on Statutory Instruments, the body which oversees SI drafting, noted that the correct way to cite these regulations would have been, "the Regulations made by the Secretary of State under section 7 of the Cremation Act 1902 and section 10 of the Births and Deaths Registration Act 1926 and dated 28th October 1930". This longer form of citation was used when the 1930 regulations were revoked by schedule 2 to the Cremation (England and Wales) Regulations 2008 (SI 2008/2841).

Scottish Statutory Instruments

A statutory instrument made by the Scottish Government is called a Scottish Statutory Instrument (or SSI). Each of these is separately numbered, with the numbering resuming from "No. 1" at the start of each calendar year; thus the Radioactive Substances Exemption (Scotland) Order 2011 is cited as "SSI 2011 No. 147", or more simply as SSI 2011/147.

Acts of Sederunt made by the Court of Session or Acts of Adjournal made by the High Court of Justiciary are numbered as Scottish Statutory Instruments.

Welsh Statutory Instruments

A statutory instrument made by the Welsh Government is called a Wales Statutory Instrument. Each of these is numbered as part of the sequence of UK SIs but is also numbered separately as part of a "W." series, with the numbering resuming from "W. 1" at the start of each calendar year. Thus, the Isle of Anglesey (Electoral Arrangements) Order 2012 is cited as "SI 2012 No. 2676 (W. 290)" (" in Welsh).

Statutory Instruments relating to Northern Ireland

Statutory instruments made by Order in Council as primary legislation for Northern Ireland are numbered as part of the main UK series of SIs, but are also numbered separately as part of an "NI" series, with the numbering resuming from "NI 1" at the start of each calendar year. Legislation passed by the Northern Ireland Assembly cites these instruments by the "NI" number only.

Secondary legislation made by the Northern Ireland Executive is numbered sequentially as part of the Statutory Rules of Northern Ireland, with the numbering resuming from "No. 1" at the start of each calendar year. The numbering mirrors that used for the UK's main series of SIs; thus the Prohibition of Traffic (Ardoyne, Belfast) Order (Northern Ireland) 2011 is cited as "SR 2011 No. 270".  Previously this type of secondary legislation was numbered as "Statutory Rules and Orders (Northern Ireland)".

Citation of specific provisions within an Act or other instrument

Primary legislation

Each distinct "enactment" within an Act of Parliament is called a section (abbreviated "s.", plural "ss."). Each section has a distinct number, in continual sequence from "s. 1" (section one) onwards. If a section is subdivided or has subordinate elements, then these are known as subsections, each of which has a bracketed number; e.g., "s. 1(4)" is subsection 4 of section 1.  Subsections are subdivided in turn into paragraphs, which are identified by an italicised letter; e.g., "s. 1(4)(c)". Subparagraphs are identified with lower-case Roman numerals; e.g., "s. 1(4)(c)(viii)".

In schedules to an Act of Parliament, each distinct numbered element is called a paragraph (abbreviated "para."), which is subdivided in turn into subparagraphs.

The sections within a lengthy or complex Act are sometimes grouped together for convenience to form a Part. A "Part" may in turn be subdivided into "chapters". Other groupings are occasionally found as well.

When an amendment to an Act requires the insertion of a new section part of the way through a numerical sequence, then sequential capital letters are used following the appropriate number; thus, a new section inserted between s. 1 and s. 2 will be numbered "s. 1A".

The terminology for the structure of Acts and Measures of the devolved parliaments and assemblies follows that used for Westminster legislation.

Parliamentary Bills

During its passage through the Westminster Parliament, each proposed enactment forming part of a Bill is known as a clause, rather than as a section. For Scottish legislation, the term "section" is used for Bills as for Acts of the Scottish Parliament.

Secondary legislation

The terminology used for the equivalent in secondary legislation of sections of an Act of Parliament depends upon the particular type of instrument; however, the numbering system follows the same pattern. A comparison of terms and abbreviations is shown in the table below.

Comparative table

Note that the naming and citation of provisions included in a schedule is the same across all forms of legislation as the system used for Westminster legislation, and has therefore been omitted from this table.

Interpretation of citations by year, statute, session, chapter, number or letter
Section 19(1) of the Interpretation Act 1978 provides:

Section 19(1)(b) refers to the edition commonly known as The Statutes of the Realm.

See also
  Numbering of bills
 Oxford Standard for Citation of Legal Authorities ("OSCOLA")
 Case citation#England and Wales
 Case citation#Scotland

References
Oxford Standard for Citation of Legal Authorities. Fourth Edition. Hart Publishing. 2012.
George Chowdharay-Best, "The Citation of Acts of Parliament" (2000) 21 Statute Law Review 126 to 141. OUP.
C T Carr. "Citation of Statutes: The Mansfield Park Standard". Cambridge Legal Essays. W Heffer & Sons. 1926. Pages 71 to 81. Google
Carr. "The Present Method of Citation of Statutes". Reviewed at (1926) 45 Law Notes 124.
B, "Correct Mode of Describing a Statute" (1842) 6(2) The Jurist 111 (No 273, 2 April 1842).
Owen Hood Phillips. "Citation" in "Statutes". A First Book of English Law. Fourth Edition. Sweet & Maxwell Limited. New Fetter Lane, London. 1960. Pages 98 to 101.
Theodore F T Plucknett. "The Citation of Statutes". A Concise History of the Common Law. Fifth Edition. 1956. Reprinted. Lawbook Exchange. 2001. Pages 326 and 327. See further page 423.
Craies and Hardcastle. "Citation". Treatise on the Construction and Effect of Statute Law. 2nd Ed. 1892. Chapter 3. Section 6. Pages 57 to 61.
Dane and Thomas. "Citation of Statutes". How to Use a Law Library. 2nd Ed. Sweet & Maxwell. 1979. Section 3-3. Page 44 et seq.
Moys. "Citation of statutes". Manual of Law Librarianship. 2nd Ed. 1987. p 97.
Colquhoun. "Citation of Statutes". Finding the Law: A Handbook for Scots Lawyers. T & T Clark. 1999. Chapter 5.3. Page 52. Google
"Proof and Citation of Statutes". Halsbury's Laws of England. 3rd Ed. 1952. Volume 36. Section 5. Page 379 et seq.
Halsbury's Statutes of England. 2nd Ed. 1950. Vol 17. p 186.
Cairns, Pugh and Mustoe; assisted by Holland. "Citation" in "Statutes". Chitty (ed). The English and Empire Digest. Butterworth & Co (Publishers) Limited. London. 1929. Volume 42. Part 10. Section 2. Page 779. Numbers 2090 to 2093.
(1927) 163 The Law Times 568 (25 June 1927)
Cheney (ed). A Handbook of Dates: For Students of British History. New Edition. Revised by Jones. Cambridge University Press. 2000. Pages 107 to 109. [Citation of statutes by date, session and chapter].
Byron D Cooper, "Anglo-American Legal Citation: Historical Development and Library Implications" (1982) 75 Law Library Journal 3 at 6, 7, 9, 14, 16, 17 and 28. Maurer School of Law. 
Edgar Stewart Fay. Discoveries in the Statute-Book. Sweet & Maxwell. 1939. pp 62 & 63. [Hanged by a Comma: The Discovery of the Statute Book. Lovat Dixon. 1937.]
Glanville William. "Statutes". Learning the Law. 1st Ed. Stevens. 1945. pp 30 & 32.
Derek J Way. The Student's Guide to Law Libraries. Oyez Publications. 1967. Pages 15 to 17. 
D J Way, "The Lawyer in the Library: A Short Account of English Legal Literature" (1961) 63 Library Association Record 236 at 237 (No 7, July 1961)
"Books of the Month" (1964) 9 The Journal of the Law Society of Scotland 181
Peter Meijes Tiersma. Parchment, Paper, Pixels: Law and the Technologies of Communication. University of Chicago Press. 2010. Page 155. [Medieval citation].
Peter Butt. "Citation of Legislation". The Lawyer's Style Guide: A Student and Practitioner Guide. Hart Publishing. 2021. Pages 131 to 133.
Webb, Maughan, Maughan, Keppel-Palmer and Boon. "Citing Legislation". Lawyers' Skills. Oxford University Press. 20th Ed. 2015. Section 5.8.1.1. pp 90 & 91. 21st Ed. 2017. pp 90 & 91.
Elkington, Holtam, Shield and Verlander. "How do I cite Legislation?". Skills for Lawyers 2021/2022. CLP Legal Practice Guides. Section 6.2.
Hanson, Kliem and Waters. "How to understand citations for domestic legislation". Learning Legal Skills and Reasoning. 5th Ed. Routledge. 2022. 
Askey and McLeod. "Citing statutes". Studying Law. Macmillan Study Skills. Red Globe Press. 2014. 2019. pp 92 & 93.
Denman. "Citing Statutes". A Digest of the Law, Practice and Procedure Relating to Indictable Offences. Sweet and Maxwell. 1912. pp 108 & 109. 
Watt and Johns. Concise Legal Research. 6th Ed. Federation Press. 2009. Chapter 1. Section 5(d). p 24.
Woods, G D. "A Note on Citations of Statutes". A History of Criminal Law in New South Wales: The Colonial Period, 1788-1900. Federation Press. 2002. p xiii.
"2.0 Legislation" in "United Kingdom". Guide to Foreign and International Legal Citation. 2nd Ed. Aspen Publsihing. 2009.

External links
 
Screencast introduction to OSCOLA

Legal citation
Law of the United Kingdom